

Potidaea (Potidaia, also Ποτείδαια, Poteidaia) was a colony founded by the Corinthians around 600 BC in the narrowest point of the peninsula of Pallene, the westernmost of three peninsulas at the southern end of Chalcidice in northern Greece.

History
While besieged by the Persians in 479 BC, the town may have been saved by a tsunami rather than a particularly high tide. Herodotus reports how the Persian attackers who tried to exploit an unusual retreat of the water were suddenly surprised by "a great flood-tide, higher, as the people of the place say, than any one of the many that had been before". In 2012 researchers from Aachen University announced that they had discovered evidence that the area should be included among Greek regions prone to tsunamis.

Tsunami are generally associated with earthquakes, but Herodotus, the source of this story, makes no mention of an earthquake at the time. This makes it more likely that the event was a meteotsunami. Not only are such events relatively common in the Mediterranean, but their effect is amplified in a long, narrow body of water, which is a good description for the situation of Potidaea, which lies at the head of Toroneos Gulf.

During the time of the Delian League, conflicts occurred between Athens and Corinth. However, the Corinthians still sent a supreme magistrate each year. Potidaea was inevitably involved in all of the conflicts between Athens and Corinth. The people revolted against the Athenians in 432 BC, and it was besieged at the beginning of the Peloponnesian War and taken in the Battle of Potidaea in 430 BC.

The Athenians retook the city in 363 BC, but in 356 BC Potidaea fell into the hands of Philip II of Macedon.  Potidaea was destroyed and its territory handed to the Olynthians. Cassander built a city on the same site which was named Cassandreia. It was probably at this time that the canal, which still exists today, was dug through the sandy soil at the narrowest part of the isthmus, perhaps with the aim of making the city a naval base. In 43 BC a Roman colony was settled by the proconsul of Macedonia, which in 30 BC was resettled by Octavian (the future Augustus) and took the official name Colonia Iulia Augusta Cassandrensis.

Modern legacy
The modern settlement of Nea Poteidaia, built for refugees from Asia Minor after the First World War, is situated near this ancient site.

In popular culture, the fictional character Gabrielle from the TV series Xena: Warrior Princess was described as being from Potidaea.

See also
Delian League
Peloponnesian Wars
List of ancient Greek cities

References

External links

The Columbia Electronic Encyclopedia, 6th ed. 2012, Columbia University Press
Greek Coinage of Potidaea

Populated places established in the 6th century BC
Populated places disestablished in the 4th century BC
Corinthian colonies
Greek colonies in Chalcidice
Former populated places in Greece
Members of the Delian League
Populated places in ancient Macedonia